The Undateables  is a 2018 South Korean television series starring Namkoong Min and Hwang Jung-eum. It aired on SBS from May 23 to July 19, 2018 on Wednesdays and Thursdays at 22:00 (KST) for 32 episodes.

Synopsis
It is a romantic comedy about Kang Hoon-nam who knows everything there is to know about love and Yoo Jung-eum whose biggest dream is to be loved and get married. The two of them get off on the wrong foot, first five years ago at the airport when Hoon-nam witnesses Jung-eum pursuing her then-boyfriend at the airport, and then in the present when they share the same client Oh Doo-ri and are initially misled into thinking the other is competition (although their employers are in fact in different industries). Coincidentally, two of Hoon-nam's friends get hooked up with two of Jung-eum's friends; Yook Ryong and Coach Yang, then followed by Lee Su-ji with Choi Jun-soo.

However Su-ji is longtime friends with Hoon-nam from Australia, while Jun-soo has been the best friend and mentor to Jung-eum for 30 years while also renting at her father's place for the last few years. When Su-ji returns from Australia to Korea then Hoon-nam has to leave his home for her, and ends up living with Jung-eum and Jun-soo much to the latter's chagrin.

After things initially don't work out, Hoon-nam and Jung-eum coincidentally cross paths again as both try to sign up Mr. Kim as a client. Mr. Kim has been dating their mutual client Doo-ri. Hoon-nam then signs up with Jung-eum's agency as a client. Su-ji pressures Jung-eum to manipulate the match so she is paired up with Hoon-nam, as she wants to marry him although his heart is not for Su-ji despite their other compatibilities.

Cast

Main
 Namkoong Min as Kang Hoon-nam
The directory of a toy gallery, and a relationship expert who doesn't believe in love. 
 Hwang Jung-eum as Yoo Jung-eum
A diving athlete-turned "relationship helper" who dreams of love and marriage, but has given them up in the face of reality.
 Choi Tae-joon as Choi Jun-soo
 A clinic doctor who is Jung-eum's best friend. 
 Oh Yoon-ah as Coach Yang Sun-hee
Coach of the National Diving Team.
 Jo Dal-hwan as Charlie
A magazine editor.
 Jung Moon-sung as Yook Ryong
Hoon-nam's cousin.

Supporting
 Nam Kyung-eub as Kang Jung-do
Hoon-nam's father. A politician. 
 Shim Hye-jin as Ko Eun-nim
Hoon-nam's stepmother.
 Lee Moon-sik as Yoo Seung-ryul
Jung-eum's father. A positive and optimistic man who serves as a motivation to his daughter.
 Lee Joo-yeon as Lee Su-ji / Lee Susie
Daughter of the President of Korea Swimming Association, who came to Korea from Australia to search for Hoon-nam.
 Myung Ji-yun 
 Baek Ji-won as Bong Sun-hwa
Jung-eum's manager at the matchmaking company.
 Seo Dong-won
 Seo Eun-woo
 Jin Ye-sol
 Kang Hui as Model

Special appearance
Jung Yong-joo as Oh Doo-ri
Jung-eum's potential client.
Ji Il-joo
 Kim Kwang-kyu as Kim So-wool

Production
The first script reading was held on April 2, 2018 at SBS Ilsan Production Center in Tanhyun, South Korea. 
 Filming began in early April.
 A press conference was held on June 7, 2018 at SBS Ilsan Production Center in Tanhyun, South Korea.

Original soundtrack

Part 1

Part 2

Part 3

Part 4

Part 5

Part 6

Part 7

Ratings
In the table below, the blue numbers represent the lowest ratings and the red numbers represent the highest ratings.
NR denotes that the drama did not rank in the top 20 daily programs on that date.
TNmS stop publishing their report from June 2018.

Awards and nominations

Notes

References

External links
   

 

Seoul Broadcasting System television dramas
Korean-language television shows
2018 South Korean television series debuts
South Korean romantic comedy television series
2018 South Korean television series endings